The 2022 CAF Women's Champions League CECAFA Qualifiers is the 2nd edition of the CAF Women's Champions League CECAFA Qualifiers, a women's club football championship organised by the CECAFA for the women's clubs of association nations. This edition will held from 28 July to 10 August 2022 in Arusha, Tanzania. but it was moved to August 14-27th in Dar es salaam, Tanzania

The winner of the tournament will qualify for the inaugural 2022 CAF Women's Champions League which will held later this year.

Participating clubs

Venues

Match officials

Referees
 Suavis Iratunga 
 Shahenda Saad Ali Emaghrabi  
 letticia Antonella Viana  
 Tsehaynesh Abebe 
 Zomadre Sonia Kore 
 Antsino Twanyanyukwa
 Salima Mukansanga
 Shamirah Nabadda 
 Zablon Chief Florentina  
 Assistant Referees
 Fides Bangurambona
 Yara Atef  
 Soukaina Hamdi
 Alice Umutoni
 Jane Charles
 Marex Nkumbi 
 Groly Tesha
 Janet Balama

Draw
The draw for this edition of the tournament was held on 20 July 2022 at 11:00 UTC (13:00 CAT) in Morocco. The eight teams were drawn into 2 group of 4 teams with   teams finishing first and second in the groups qualifying for the knockout stages.

Group stage
The tournament will played into two groups format.

Tiebreakers
Teams are ranked according to points (3 points for a win, 1 point for a draw, 0 points for a loss), and if tied on points, the following tiebreaking criteria are applied, in the order given, to determine the rankings.
Points in head-to-head matches among tied teams;
Goal difference in head-to-head matches among tied teams;
Goals scored in head-to-head matches among tied teams;
If more than two teams are tied, and after applying all head-to-head criteria above, a subset of teams are still tied, all head-to-head criteria above are reapplied exclusively to this subset of teams;
Goal difference in all group matches;
Goals scored in all group matches;
Penalty shoot-out if only two teams are tied and they met in the last round of the group;
Disciplinary points (yellow card = 1 point, red card as a result of two yellow cards = 3 points, direct red card = 3 points, yellow card followed by direct red card = 4 points);
Drawing of lots.

Time UTC +3

Group A

Group B

Knockout stage

Bracket

Semi-finals

Third place match

Final

Statistics

Goalscorers

own goal

References

External links

2022 CAF Women's Champions League
Women's Champions League
CAF